"Mousetrap Heart" is the first single from Thirsty Merc's third album Mousetrap Heart. It was released as a digital download on 21 May 2010.

The track received positive reviews from fans and critics alike with most praising the band's polished new sound, owed partly to U.S. album producer, Matt Wallace (Maroon 5). Mousetrap Heart received heavy airplay in Australia soon after its release to radio in May 2010

The female singer featured in Mousetrap Heart is Carmen Smith

The single kicked off the Mousetrap Heart Australian Tour, in support the single and album.
The music video was shot in Los Angeles and features LA-based, Argentinian dancer Carolina Cerisola dancing around and on a piano that singer Rai is playing.

Track listing
"Mousetrap Heart" – 3:29

Charts

References

2010 singles
Thirsty Merc songs
Songs written by Rai Thistlethwayte
2010 songs
Warner Music Group singles